Tom Byam Shaw (also known as Tom Purbeck, Tag Stewart, and Tom Stewart) is an English actor. The son of  producer Matthew Byam Shaw and actor Melanie Thaw, and grandson of actor Sheila Hancock, Byam Shaw studied acting at The Neighborhood Playhouse School of the Theatre in New York City.

Career
Stewart won his role in A Room with a View within minutes of auditioning, while on his gap year before university.  The casting directors have called him "a real star in the making."

Select filmography

Notes

External links

English male television actors
Living people
Year of birth missing (living people)